Shannon Sigrist (born 20 April 1999) is a Swiss ice hockey player and member of the Swiss national ice hockey team, currently playing with Linköping HC Dam of the Swedish Women's Hockey League (SDHL). She represented Switzerland in the women's ice hockey tournament at the 2018 Winter Olympics and at the IIHF Women's World Championship in 2015, 2016, 2017, and 2019.

References

External links

1999 births
Living people
Swiss women's ice hockey defencemen
Olympic ice hockey players of Switzerland
Ice hockey players at the 2018 Winter Olympics
Ice hockey players at the 2022 Winter Olympics
Linköping HC Dam players